The Belgium women's national football team (nicknamed Belgian Red Flames) represents Belgium in international women's football. It is controlled by the Royal Belgian Football Association, the governing body for football in Belgium. Their home stadium is Den Dreef and their current coach Ives Serneels. During most of their history the team has had poor results but showed improvement in the Euro 2013 and 2015 World Cup Qualifiers. In 2016, they qualified for their first major tournament: Euro 2017. In 2022, they won the Pinatar Cup in San Pedro del Pinatar (Spain).

History

Early days (1976–1984)
Belgium played its first match against France on May 30, 1976 at Stade Auguste Delaune in Reims, France. The game ended in a 2–1 victory. A year after this debut, the Belgian team played against Switzerland and France, tying both matches, 2–2 and 1–1 respectively. They played the same teams again the next year, this time beating both with 1–0 and 2–0. Another victory followed against Yugoslavia with 1–0. The team's first defeat however came at the hands of England: 3–0, which was followed by a 2–0 loss against France and a 2–2 tie against the Netherlands. In the following years, Belgium kept playing mostly against European teams.

First tournaments (1984–1989)
Belgium participated in qualifications for the first time for the 1984 European Competition for Women's Football. They were sorted in Group 4 with the Netherlands, Denmark and West Germany. The campaign started off well with a 3–2 victory over the Netherlands, but continued with a 1–0 loss against Denmark and a 1–1 draw against West Germany. Despite having a neutral goal difference at this point, the Belgian team ended up last in the group after a 5–0 defeat against the Netherlands and draws against their other two opponents, 2–2 against Denmark and 1–1 against West Germany.

Their second attempt at qualifying was for the 1987 European Competition, where they were joined in Group 3 by France, the Netherlands again and Sweden. Their games against France were one win and one loss, both 3–1. Their matches against their two other opponents however were all defeats: 3–1 and 3–0 against The Netherlands, and 5–0 and 2–1 against Sweden. This resulted in Belgium again ending last in the group.

In attempting to qualify for the 1989 tournament they did better. They played in Group 4 against four other teams: Czechoslovakia, France, Spain and Bulgaria. Among the eight games, they won two, drew four and lost two, with 7 goals for and 4 against. This earned them third place in the group of five, which did not suffice for qualification.

Stagnation (1990–2011)
The Belgian team suffered a series of poor results from 1990 to 2011. They never won even half of their matches in any of the qualification campaigns during this period, except for one. This notable exception was the 2003 Women's World Cup qualifiers, where they won five games and suffered only one loss. Scotland however had achieved the same result and with better goal difference, leaving Belgium second in their group. This was nevertheless Belgium's best performance at the World Cup qualifiers until 2019 when they went out in the play-offs. It was followed by their worst: they lost all eight games in the next iteration (2007). At the UEFA Women's Euro qualifications, their best performances during this period were at the 1995 edition and the 2009 edition, both times losing 'only' half of their matches and drawing one.

Improvements (2011–2018)
An era of victories began when Ives Serneels replaced Anne Noë as manager in 2011. Serneels led the team to improved qualification campaigns for Euro 2013 and 2015 World Cup, both times ending third in the group (just short of qualifying). Between both campaigns, the Belgian female football team adopted the nickname "Belgian Red Flames". Following the improvements, the RBFA invested in more growth in 2015, targeting qualification for Euro 2017. After a successful start in their qualifications group, the team was invited to play at the 2016 Algarve Cup in Portugal, one of the most prestigious women's international football events.

Belgium finished second in their Euro 2017 qualifications group (after England), which was enough to earn them their first ever qualification for a major tournament. At the European championship Belgium secured a 2–0 upset win over Norway during the group stage. However, after losing 1–0 to Denmark and 2–1 to the Netherlands, they finished third in their group and did not advance to the knockout rounds.

First success (2019–present)
Belgium performed well in UEFA World Cup Qualifying for the 2019 World Cup and secured second place in Group 6 behind Italy. As a result, they qualified for the UEFA Play-offs as they were one of the top 4 ranked second place teams. Switzerland, the Netherlands and Denmark were the other teams in the play-off. Belgium faced Switzerland in their play-off semi-final, after two legs the aggregate score was 3–3, but Switzerland advanced on away goals. The Netherlands went on to defeat Switzerland in the play-off final to claim the final UEFA qualifying spot at the 2019 World Cup.
Also in 2019, Belgium ended 3rd during the 2019 Cyprus cup after defeating Austria on penalties.

In 2022, Belgium won the Pinatar Cup, a friendly tournament held in Spain, beating Russia on penalties. 
Euro 2022 was a success for Belgium, who managed to get out of the first round and reach the quarter-finals for the first time in their second appearance at the continental finals. The Red Flames finished 2nd in Group D behind France, the group's favorite against whom they conceded a narrow defeat (1–2), but ahead of Iceland and Italy after a 1–1 draw against the former and a 1–0 victory against the latter (an outgoing quarter-finalists of the 2019 World Cup), in the last match. All this combined with the lack of a victory for the Icelandic women against the French, who were already assured a finish in first place of the group, in the other match (1–1). This historic qualification was made possible in part by the performance of Belgian goalkeeper Nicky Evrard, who saved two penalties in the first two games (against Iceland and France). Belgium faced Sweden in the quarter-finals to, the winner of group C and silver medalist at the Olympic games in Tokyo. The Belgians lost by a score of 0–1 at the end of the match and saw their journey end at this stage of the competition.

Team image

Nicknames
At the start of the qualifying campaign for the 2015 World Cup in Canada, the team earned their first and current nickname: the "Belgian Red Flames". Prior to that, they were simply known as "Rode Duivelinnen" (Red Devil Ladies).

Kits and crest
On September 19, 2022 the RBFA presented new home kits. This was the first time that a unified look was presented for all Belgian national teams. It replaces the one-off black home shirt which was released earlier in support of women's football in Belgium.
The kit comes with a red base, and black and yellow details representing the Belgian flag. The jersey features a dynamic graphic print of flames on both sleeves, hinting at the team's nickname "Red Flames".

Kit suppliers

Home stadium

The team plays their home matches mostly at Den Dreef but occasionally at other stadiums in Belgium.

Results and fixtures

The following is a list of match results in the last 12 months, as well as any future matches that have been scheduled.

Legend

2022

2023

Coaching staff

Current coaching staff

Manager history

 Albert Bers (1976–1991)
 Marc Van Geersom (1991–1994)
 Johan Bol (1994–1999)
 Anne Noë (1999–2010)
 Ives Serneels (2011–)

Players

Current squad

Notes
INJ = Withdrew due to injury

Recent call-ups
The following players have been called up in the past 12 months.

Notes
RET = Retired from the national team
PRE = Preliminary squad

Individual records

Players in bold are still active.

Competitive record
Belgium has not yet featured at the World Cup, but has reached the end stage of the Euro 2017 tournament. Their best qualification rounds before that were for 2003 World Cup, 2013 Euro and 2015 World Cup.

FIFA Women's World Cup

UEFA Women's Championship

Algarve Cup
Belgium was invited to play at the 2016 Algarve Cup in Portugal and ended fifth out of eight teams. The teams were divided into two groups; after the group stage, placement matches were played among the equally ranked teams from both groups. Belgium ended third in Group A, and won the placement match against Russia (third place in Group B) with 5–0.

Cyprus Cup
Belgium has been invited to the Cyprus Cup four times, . Their first appearance was in 2015. They were sorted into group C that year, with Mexico, Czech Republic and South Africa, and ended last in the group. They also lost the placement match (after penalties) against South Korea, resulting in the last place of all 12 teams. In 2017 Belgium finished third in Group A with Switzerland, North Korea and Italy, and eventually reached seventh place out of 12 after winning the placement match against Austria.

Belgium was also invited to play the tournament in 2018, in a group with Austria, Czech Republic and Spain. They ended second in the group behind eventual winner Spain, and fifth overall (out of 12) after winning the placement match against South Africa. Belgium returned to the Cyprus Cup in 2019. They were in Group C with Austria, Slovakia and Nigeria. Belgium finished in third place after defeating Austria on penalties in the third place match.

Pinatar Cup 
Belgium were crowned Pinatar Cup champions in 2022. Belgium beat Russia in the final after taking the game to penalties.

FIFA world rankings

 Worst Ranking   Best Ranking   Worst Mover   Best Mover

Head-to-head record
The following table shows Belgium's all-time international record.

Honours

Regional
Cyprus cup
  3rd: 2019
Pinatar Cup
  Champions: 2022

See also
Sport in Belgium
Football in Belgium
Women's football in Belgium
Belgium women's national football team
Belgium women's national football team results
List of Belgium women's international footballers
Belgium women's national under-20 football team
Belgium women's national under-17 football team
Belgium women's national futsal team
Belgium men's national football team

References

External links

Official website
FIFA profile
List of international players, belgianfootball.be

 
European women's national association football teams
national
1976 establishments in Belgium
Association football clubs established in 1976